In grammar, the instructive case is a grammatical case used in the Finnish, Estonian, and Turkish languages.

Finnish 
In the Finnish language, the instructive case has the basic meaning of "by means of". It is a comparatively rarely used case, though it is found in some commonly used expressions, such as omin silmin → "with one's own eyes".

In modern Finnish, many of its instrumental uses are being superseded by the adessive case, as in "minä matkustin junalla" → "I travelled by train."

It is also used with Finnish verbal second infinitives to mean "by ...ing", e.g. "lentäen" → "by flying", "by air" ("lentää" = "to fly").

Estonian 
In Estonian, the instructive case (Estonian: viisiütlev) also exists, but only in some words. (f.e: "jalgsi" - "on foot", from "jalg" - foot). The case is therefore not counted as one of the 14 cases of Standard Estonian.

Turkish 
In Turkish, the suffix -le is used for this purpose. Ex: Trenle geldim "I came via train".

Further reading
 
 
 

Grammatical cases